Ada Mary King-Milbanke, 14th Baroness Wentworth (26 February 1871 – 18 June 1917) was a British peer.

King-Milbanke was the only child of Ralph King-Milbanke, 2nd Earl of Lovelace, Byron's grandson and his first wife, Fanny/Fannie Heriot (daughter of the Reverend George Heriot 1817–1869). She was named after her paternal grandmother, Ada Lovelace, mathematician and pioneer of computer programming. After her parents' separation shortly after her birth, she was raised by her paternal aunt, Lady Anne Blunt, co-owner of the internationally influential Crabbet Arabian Stud, a horse-breeding establishment with farms in the south of England and near Cairo, Egypt. On the death of her father in 1906, she inherited his barony of Wentworth. She died unmarried and childless in 1917 and the title then passed to her aforementioned aunt, Lady Anne.

Notes

14
Daughters of British earls
Hereditary women peers
1871 births
1917 deaths